The 2009 Sámi parliamentary election was held in Norway on September 14, 2009. Voters elected 39 members for the Sámi Parliament of Norway.

The election saw significant losses for the two dominant parties in the Sámi Parliament, the Norwegian Labour Party and Norwegian Sámi Association. Two third parties made a breakthrough, the new Árja and the Progress Party, with three seats each.

Negotiations
Both the Labour Party and Norwegian Sámi Association had refused to cooperate with the Progress Party, who notably seek the dismantling of the Sámi Parliament. While both Labour and NSR were reluctant to give hold to a so-called "minor party tyranny", the parties also thought it unlikely to establish a Sámi Parliament Council together, but held that it could not be ruled entirely out. Both parties sought cooperation with the Árja Party. Árja held that they could cooperate with all parties, with the likely exception of the Progress Party, citing it "could be problematic". Árja mainly sought to establish a "bloc" together with the Kautokeino reindeer herders list, while also negotiating with both the main parties, as well as Nordkalottfolket.

Result
In the end, a majority Sámi Parliament Council was elected, supported by the Labour Party (14 seats), Árja (3), Nordkalottfolket (1), Åarjel-Saemiej Gielh (1), and an unaffiliated Sámi resident of Southern Norway (1). The Sámi Parliament Council itself, consisted of Egil Olli (Labour) as President, Láilá Susanne Vars (Árja) as Vice President, and the council members Ellinor Marita Jåma (Åarjel-Saemiej Gielh), Marianne Balto (Labour) and Vibeke Larsen (Labour). The council was later complained in to the Control Committee by Labour politician Åge Nils Haugen, as the council violated its own equal rights laws, as it consisted of four women and only one man. The complaint was also supported by the Progress Party.

Results
Election results for the 2009 Sámi parliamentary election. Voter turnout was 68.0%.

See also
2009 Norwegian parliamentary election

References

Sami, 2009
Sami, 2009
Norwegian Sámi parliamentary elections
Sámi in Norway
2009 elections in Europe
Sami parliamentary election
September 2009 events in Europe